The Hiram D. Scott House, at 4603 Scotts Valley Dr. in Scotts Valley, California, was built in 1853.  It was listed on the National Register of Historic Places in 1977.

Scotts Valley was named after Hiram Daniel Scott, who purchased Rancho San Agustin, including the valley, in 1850 from Joseph Ladd Majors.

Hiram Scott built the Greek revival style Scott House in 1853. Situated behind City Hall, it is a Santa Cruz County Historical Trust Landmark and is on the National Register of Historic Places. The house originally stood on Scotts Valley Drive, near where a Bank of America branch is now located.

References

		
National Register of Historic Places in Santa Cruz County, California
Houses completed in 1853